Nauan Hazrat is the name of Nauryzbay Talasov, a theologian who preached Muslim morality.

Nauan Hazrat may also refer to:

 Nauan Hazrat Mosque